Nawnghkio Township is a township of Kyaukme District in the Shan State of eastern Myanmar. The principal town and administrative seat is Nawnghkio. The name 'Nawnghkio' was started to call after a camp near a green lake (Shan language: nawng = lake or natural pond, hkio = green). The lake is located in the west of 'Haw Taw Monastery' of today's Nawnghkio.

Geography
The township lies between 22° 45' and 23° 15' north latitude and 96° 00' and 97° 00' east longitude. Altitude ranges from 700 feet above the sea level in the lowest to 4300 feet in the highest with an average of 2750 feet. Occupying nearly half of the center of the land is highly productive plane surrounded by mountains in north, east, south and west. Mountains of the southern region are the highest. More than half of the surface area is covered by rain forests. Average number of raining days range from 90 to 130 days per year and annual rail fall varies from 47 to 70 inches. Thunder storms struck the area in the rainy season (May to October). Being in the temperate zone, the temperature varies from 43°-81 °F in the cold season to 61°-96 °F in the hot season. Many small rivers and streams are running across the township throughout the year forming waterfalls in some places. These waterfalls include Inn Wine waterfall, Namngo waterfall, Inn Hpo waterfall, Chaunggyi Yay Pyan Taung waterfall and Thabyedoe waterfalls. A hot water spring can be seen near Seik Hpu village. Thirty small dams are constructed for irrigation. Small scale hydroelectric power is used in many places.

Borders
Nawnghkio Township is bordered by:
 Thabeikkyin Township and Mogok Township to the north,
 Kyaukme Township to the northeast and east,
 Lawksawk Township to the south and
 Singu Township, Madaya Township, Pyinoolwin Township and Kyaukse Township to the west and southwest.

Towns and villages
Thonze town is the administrative seat of the township in the past. On 28/April/1899, at the same time the Goteik viaduct (bridge) was started to be built across the Gokteik gorge near Nawnghkio, the seat moved to Nawnghkio. On 10/August/1961, Nawnghkio Farm Council was founded. According to official announcement letter from the Ministry of Internal Affairs dated 21/June/1972, Nawnghkio Township was organized with the following 6 wards and 35 village tracts of 249 villages:
 Nawnghkio Myoma Group of 6 wards: Zay, Bhu Tar, Taung, Par Hat, Thapyay Yay, Nar Shao
 Kone Sam village tract
 Long Yone village tract
 Ngoke Ka Lay village tract
 Long Wei village tract
 Mak Hki Nu village tract
 Nyan Taw village tract
 Kan Gyi village tract
 Shwe Moke Htaw village tract
 Taung Shey village tract（Taung Kham）
 Yae Twin Gyi village tract
 Nawng Taw village tract
 Inn Hpo village tract
 Me Poke village tract
 Thone Se village tract
 Hsam Ma Hse village tract
 Ong Ma Hkar village tract
 Pin Tee village tract
 Bant Bway village tract
 Kone Gyi Ywar Ma village tract
 Kyein Ga Naing village tract
 Ah Nauk Kyu Inn village tract
 Nyaung Tauk village tract
 Hko Ong village tract
 Kone Thar village tract
 Seik Hpu village tract
 Ku Lar Kwe village tract
 Doe Pin village tract
 Kyauk Gyi village tract
 Bant Bway Kyin village tract
 Ho Hko (North) village tract
 Hsi Hson village tract
 Kone Gyi village tract
 Than Bo village tract
 Tha Yet Kone village tract
 Ah Htet Kyu Inn village tract

Geology
Myanmar's biggest earthquake, measuring 8.2 on the Richter scale, took place in 1912 along the Kyauk Kyan Fault in northern Shan State, another of the country's main faults (the first is the Sagaing Fault and the third is the Rakhine Fault). Kyaukkyan fault is one of the prominent seismotectonic feature (Lat. 22˚ 18´N – Long. 96˚ 44´E). The large earthquake of 23 May 1912 (8.0 RM) with many foreshocks and aftershocks, seems to be associated with that fault. It runs nearly north–south direction. Kyauk Kyan fault is 800 kilometres long, stretching from Shan State to southern Kayah State.

Ethnic Groups, Language and Religion
Major ethnic groups are Danu (37%), Shan (33%) and Bamar (25%) which make more than 95% of township population. Other ethnic groups are Gurkha, Kachin, Kokant, Lisu, Palaung, Chin, Karen, Rakhine, Lahu, Nepalis, Mon, Myaungzi, Indian, Chinese and Kayah. Myanmar is the official language and is used by most of the population. Different ethnic groups also use their own languages. Some of the Gurkha also use English and Kokant also use local Chinese language in use. Buddhism is the main religion (95.05%). , Hindu, Christian and Muslim are less common religions. About one-third (33%) total township population are under 18 years of age.

Economy
Agriculture is the major economy of the township (43% of township population). Rice, corn and sugarcane are main crops grown in the township. Other choices farmers are wheat, peanut, beans, sunflower, sesame, potato, flowers, coffee, damson, tea, orange, lichee, Macadamia and rubber.
Agriculture based industry, timber extraction, charcoal production, burnt lime production, apiculture (bee keeping), and animal husbandry are other economies.
People trade in "Every-Fifth-Day-Markets", which are well-known trading places in Shan State, situated in Nawnghkio, Kangyi, Tawnghkam, Ban Bwe, Hsumhsai, Thonse, Hokho and Thayetkon villages. Annual pagoda festivals are also popular trading places. People also trade in brokers' sales centers. Nawnghkio Myanma Economic Bank, KBZ Bank, CB Bank, Aya Bank and Myanmar Apex Banks are the available banking services  of the township.
Mining is another economic contributor to the township. Yadanar Theigi Mine is in the north most part of the township. Other smaller mines are also functional. Mines in the township are productive of various kinds of metals.

Special Places
Gokteik bridge
Innpho Swamp situated near Innma village in Hokho village tract
Innwine and Namp Ngo Waterfalls near Innwine village and Yay Pyan Taung Waterfall near Chaunggyi village in Seeson village tract.
Seikhpu Hot spring
Ancient stupas and temples: in Thonze, Myin Phyu, Thaphankaing, Shweku-letpan, Chaungtha (Hokho village tract) and Namlinkhan village
"Saya San Cave" situated 3 kilometers southeast of Hokho village where the leader of the Burmese peasant revolt of 1930-1931 and the leader of the first concerted effort to forcefully resist British domination, Saya San, and his followers spent their last days.
Convict camps (labor camp or prison farm or penal colony)

Gallery

Notes

External links
 "Nawnghkio Google Satellite Map" map of administrative area with listing of principal settlements, from Maplandia
 "Nawnghkio Township - Shan State" Myanmar Information Management Unit (MIMU)

Townships of Shan State